Plan C Studios is an Indian motion picture production company founded as an alliance between Anil Ambani’s Reliance Entertainment and Neeraj Pandey and Shital Bhatia’s Friday Filmworks.  It is the result of a 50:50 joint venture between the two production houses.

Plan C Studios made waves in the Indian film industry by launching its first production, Akshay Kumar starrer Rustom (film) which released on 12 August 2016.  Subsequent productions include Naam Shabana  (a prequel to Pandey's 2015 film Baby) which was released on 31 March 2017.

Toilet: Ek Prem Katha, starring Akshay Kumar and Bhumi Pednekar was released worldwide on 11 August 2017. It is a love story with a satirical flavor directed by Shree Narayan Singh and produced by Aruna Bhatia, Plan C Studios and Abundantia. It is presented by Viacom 18 and KriArj Entertainment.

Aiyaary, starring Sidharth Malhotra and Manoj Bajpayee was released on 16 February 2018.

Filmography

References

Indian companies established in 2015
Film production companies based in Mumbai
2015 establishments in Maharashtra
Mass media companies established in 2015